The Old White County Courthouse is a historic county courthouse building in Cleveland, Georgia, and home to the White County Historical Society. It was built in 1859. It was added to the National Register of Historic Places on October 28, 1970. It is on GA 115, and flanked by the northbound and southbound lanes of US 129 between SR 115 as well as East Jarrard Street to the north. The building was used for White County government business until 1962 when a modernist courthouse was built south of the square on South Main Street.

See also
National Register of Historic Places listings in White County, Georgia

References

External links
White County Historical Society website

Courthouses on the National Register of Historic Places in Georgia (U.S. state)
Government buildings completed in 1859
Buildings and structures in White County, Georgia
History museums in Georgia (U.S. state)
National Register of Historic Places in White County, Georgia
White County Courthouse